The 2019 Women's State of Origin was the second State of Origin rugby league match between the New South Wales and Queensland women's teams played at North Sydney Oval on 21 June 2019. The match was the second played under the State of Origin banner.

New South Wales defeated Queensland 14–4, extending their winning streak over their rivals to four games. New South Wales  Maddie Studdon was awarded the Nellie Doherty Medal for Player of the Match.

Background
On 22 May 2019, North Sydney Oval was announced as the venue for the 2019 Women's State of Origin, hosting the game for the second consecutive season. Also announced was the first under-18 Women's State of Origin game, which would take place as a curtain-raiser to the senior game.

Teams

Match summary

Under-18s
The Under-18 Women's State of Origin was played as a curtain-raiser to the senior Women's State of Origin match. New South Wales defeated Queensland 24–4 in the inaugural game at North Sydney Oval, with Blues'  Caitlan Johnston named Player of the Match. The game was livestreamed on NRL.com.

Teams

Match summary

References 

2019 in Australian rugby league
State
2019 in Australian women's sport
Rugby League State of Origin
Women's rugby league competitions in Australia
Rugby league in Sydney
Rugby league competitions in New South Wales
North Sydney, New South Wales